Sir George Steven Harvie-Watt, 1st Baronet, QC, TD, DL, FRSA (23 August 1903 – 18 December 1989) was a British barrister and Conservative Party politician.

Harvie-Watt studied at George Watson's College in Edinburgh, then at the University of Glasgow and the University of Edinburgh. In 1924, he was commissioned into the Territorial Army Royal Engineers. In 1930, he became a barrister at Inner Temple, while at the 1931 general election, he was elected as Member of Parliament (MP) for Keighley. He lost his seat in 1935, but re-entered Parliament by winning a by-election for the seat of Richmond (Surrey) in 1937. He immediately became Parliamentary Private Secretary to the Board of Trade, and was also promoted in the Territorial Army: to Lieutenant-Colonel in 1938, and Brigadier in 1941.

From 1941 to 1945, Harvie-Watt served as Parliamentary Private Secretary to Winston Churchill. He was awarded the Efficiency Decoration (TD) in 1942 for 20 years service in the Territorial Army. At the end of World War II, he became a Queen's Counsel and was created a baronet (see Harvie-Watt baronets). In 1948 he became an aide-de-camp to George VI; on the king's death, he filled the same position for Elizabeth II, also acting as a member of the Queen's Body Guard for Scotland. He left Parliament at the 1959 general election, becoming the chairman of Consolidated Gold Fields.

He was Deputy Lieutenant of Greater London from 1966 to 1989 and was made a Fellow of the Royal Society of Arts in 1973.

References

External links 
 

1903 births
1989 deaths
People educated at George Watson's College
Alumni of the University of Edinburgh
Alumni of the University of Glasgow
Conservative Party (UK) MPs for English constituencies
Deputy Lieutenants of Greater London
Deputy Lieutenants of Surrey
Parliamentary Private Secretaries to the Prime Minister
UK MPs 1931–1935
UK MPs 1935–1945
UK MPs 1945–1950
UK MPs 1950–1951
UK MPs 1951–1955
UK MPs 1955–1959
Members of the Inner Temple
20th-century King's Counsel